John Henry Goldfrap (1879 – November 21, 1917) was an English-born journalist and author of boys' books, participating in the "American series phenomenon". He always wrote under pseudonyms.

Biography 

John Goldfrap was a member of the staff of the Evening World. He was born in England, and worked first at San Francisco newspapers, and then came to New York in 1905.

In addition to his children's stories and newspaper work, Goldfrap wrote movie scripts.

Goldfrap died on November 21, 1917 at Seaside Hospital, Staten Island, from tuberculosis. He left a widow.

Works
Goldfrap wrote under various pen names, including "Captain James Carson," "Freemont B. Deering," "Marvin West," "Howard Payson," and "Captain Wilbur Lawton". Under the latter name he wrote the 1915 film The Wonderful Adventure.

Following is a list of his works under the respective pseudonyms.

Captain Wilbur Lawton
 The Boy Aviators (eight volumes, 1910–1915)			
 The Dreadnought Boys (six volumes, 1911–1914)		
 The Ocean Wireless Boys (six volumes, 1914–1917)
			
Lieutenant Howard Payson
 The Boy Scouts (14 volumes, 1911–1918)
 The Motor Cycle Chums (six volumes, 1912–1915)
			
Marvin West
 The Motor Rangers (six volumes, 1911–1914)		

Dexter J. Forrester
 The Bungalow Boys (six volumes, 1911–1914)
					
Freemont B. Deering
 The Border Boys (six volumes, 1911–1914)

References

External links

 
 
 
 
 Canadian children's books, see #610
 Canadian children's books, see #691
  – the primary identity for Goldfrap at LC, with four other pseudonyms in turn
 In WorldCat participating libraries: Goldfrap (primarily as Payson?), Deering, Lawton, Forrester, West

American children's writers
1879 births
1917 deaths
20th-century American male writers
English emigrants to the United States
20th-century deaths from tuberculosis
Tuberculosis deaths in New York (state)
20th-century pseudonymous writers